A chalk talk is an illustrated performance in which the speaker draws pictures to emphasize lecture points and create a memorable and entertaining experience for listeners. Chalk talks differ from other types of illustrated talks in their use of real-time illustration rather than static images. They achieved great popularity during the late nineteenth and early twentieth centuries, appearing in vaudeville shows, Chautauqua assemblies, religious rallies, and smaller venues. Since their inception, chalk talks have been both a popular form of entertainment and a pedagogical tool.

Early history

One of the earliest chalk talk artists was a prohibition illustrator named Frank Beard (1842-1905). Beard was a professional illustrator and editorial cartoonist who published in The Ram's Horn, an interdenominational social gospel magazine.  Beard's wife was a Methodist, and when the women of their church asked Beard to draw some pictures as part of an evening of entertainment they were planning, the chalk talk was born. In 1896, Beard published Chalk lessons; or, The black-board in the Sunday school which he dedicated to the Rev. Albert D. Vail "Through whose simple Black-board teaching I was first led to search the Scriptures and my own heart."

Public performance 
Like magic lantern shows and Lyceum lectures, chalk talks, with their presentation of images changing in real-time, could be educational as well as entertaining. They were choreographed performances "where the images would become animate, melding one into another in an orderly and progressive way" to tell a story. Chalk talks began to be used for religious rallies and became popular acts in vaudeville and at Chautuaqua assemblies.  Some performers, such as James Stuart Blackton created acts around "lightning sketches," drawings which were rapidly modified as the audience looked on. "Tricks" or illustrative techniques used by performers were called "stunts." The seemingly magical stunts, and the chalk talk artist's power to transform simple images before their audiences' eyes appealed to magicians. Cartoonist and magician Harlan Tarbell performed as a chalk-talker and published several chalk talk method books. 

Winsor McCay began doing vaudeville chalk talks in 1906. In his The Seven Ages of Man vaudeville act, he drew two infant faces, a boy and a girl, and progressively aged them. Popular illustrator Vernon Grant was also known for his vaudeville circuit chalk talks. Pulitzer prize winning cartoonist John T. McCutcheon was a popular chalk talk performer. Artist and suffragist Adele Goodman Clark set up her easel on a street corner to convince listeners to support woman suffrage. Canadian cartoonist John Wilson Bengough toured internationally, giving chalk talks both for entertainment and in support of causes including woman suffrage and prohibition.

Animation
Chalk talks contributed to the development of early animated films, such as The Enchanted Drawing, by J. Stuart Blackton and his partner, Alfred E. Smith.  Blackton's Humorous Phases of Funny Faces (1906) was another early animation with its roots in chalk talks. For his early films, Winsor McCay borrowed Blackton's image of the artist standing before drawings which come to life.

References

External links
Charles L. Bartholomew's Chalk Talk and Crayon Presentation: a handbook of practice and performance in pictorial expression of ideas
Frank Beard, Chalk lessons, or The blackboard in the Sunday school 
Daniel Carter Beard, "How to Prepare and Give a Boys' Chalk-Talk," New Ideas for American Boys; the Jack of All Trades
J. W. Bengough, Bengough's Chalk-Talks: A Series of Platform Addresses on Various Topics, With Reproductions of the Impromptu Drawings With Which They Were Illustrated.
Golden Chalk Classics (chalk talk archive)
William Allen Bixler, Chalk Talk Made Easy 
Bert Joseph Griswold, Crayon and character : truth made clear through eye and ear or ten-minute talks with colored chalks
Ash Davis Cartoonist Pictured Fun Quickly Done. Ash Davis promotional materials, Redpath Chautauqua Collection, University of Iowa Libraries

Vaudeville tropes
Illustration
History of animation
Chautauqua